Line-Up is the third album released by English singer, Graham Bonnet, formerly of Rainbow. The album made extensive use of backing musicians and writers who, at the time, belonged to the bands Whitesnake and Status Quo.

Track listing
Side one
"Night Games" (Ed Hamilton) – 4:38  
"Anthony Boy" (Chuck Berry) – 3:28 
"Dirty Hand" (Bob Young, Micky Moody) – 3:40 
"Out on the Water" (Young, Moody) – 3:40  
"Don't Stand in the Open" (Young, Moody) – 3:25  
"Set Me Free" (Ray Davies) – 4:19

Side two
"Liar" (Russ Ballard) – 3:04  
"S.O.S" (Ballard) – 3:12  
"I'm a Lover" (David Kerr-Clemenson, Andrew Martin Locke) – 3:46 
"Be My Baby" (Phil Spector, Jeff Barry, Ellie Greenwich) – 3:03  
"That's the Way That It Is" (Paul Bliss) – 3:18

Personnel
Musicians
Graham Bonnet – lead and backing vocals
Micky Moody – lead guitar, acoustic guitar on track 1
Francis Rossi – synthesizer in track 1, rhythm guitar and backing vocals on track 4, producer on tracks 1 and 4
Russ Ballard - guitar on track 8
Kirby Gregory - guitar on tracks 8 and 10
Rick Parfitt - guitar on track 2
Gary Twigg - bass
Chris Stewart - bass on tracks 2, 3, 5, 11
Neil Murray – bass on track 4
Adrian Lee - synthesizer on tracks 2, 3, 6, 8, 11, keyboards on track 10
Ian Lynn - synthesizer on tracks 7 and 9, electric piano on track 7
John Cook - keyboards on track 8
Andy Bown - piano on track 1 and 4, organ on track 4
Jon Lord – organ on track 5
Cozy Powell – drums, percussion
Martin Ditcham - percussion on track 10
Mel Collins - saxophone on track 2

Production
John Eden - producer, engineer
Arun Chakraverty - mastering

References

1981 albums
Graham Bonnet albums
Vertigo Records albums